The Hundred of Forrest is a cadastral hundred of  the County of Robinson in South Australia.
The main population centre is the Streaky Bay hinterland.

History
The traditional owners of the area are the Wirangu and Nauo people, both speakers of the Wirangu language. The first European to sight the area was Dutch explorer Pieter Nuyts, in 1627 in the Golden Zeepaard and in 1802 Matthew Flinders. Flinders named Streaky Bay whilst on his voyage in the Investigator. The first European land exploration was that of John Hill and Samuel Stephens in 1839, followed by Edward John Eyrein the same year.

Climate

References

Forrest